World Triathlon, previously known as the International Triathlon Union (ITU), is the international governing body for the multi-sport disciplines of triathlon, duathlon, aquathlon and other nonstandard variations. World Triathlon hosts the top level international race series the World Triathlon Championship Series and the ITU Triathlon World Cup. World Triathlon also has a long-distance race circuit with official world championships. Additionally, World Triathlon sanctions and organizes official Aquathlon (run-swim-run), Duathlon (run-bike-run) and Winter triathlon championships. World Triathlon is headquartered in Lausanne, Switzerland

History 

Versions of swim bike run multi-sports existed in the 1920s, but it wasn't until the term triathlon was coined in 1974 in San Diego that triathlon exploded in popularity. This rapid development drew the attention of the International Olympic Committee (IOC), which initiated a discussion in 1988 to include it in the  Olympic Games program. The then IOC President Juan Antonio Samaranch held a meeting in Stockholm, Sweden, with the intention of making triathlon an Olympic sport as soon as possible. At that meeting Canadian Les McDonald was selected as President to a working committee for triathlon, while Sweden's Sture Jonasson was elected as Secretary.

World Triathlon was founded as the International Triathlon Union (ITU) one year later, on April 1, 1989, at the first ITU Congress in Avignon, France. A total of 30 National Federations attended the initial Congress and preparations were made for the sport's first World Championships to be held in Avignon in August 1989. At this meeting the Olympic distance (later renamed to standard)  was set at a 1.5-km swim, 40-km bike and 10-km run the distances were chosen as they were already present at the Olympics for each discipline individually. More than 800 athletes representing 40 countries competed in the first World Championships, and Canada's Les McDonald was elected as ITU's first president in 1989.

ITU began the World Cup series in 1991, staging 11 races in eight countries. Triathlon was officially added to the Olympic Programme by the IOC at its Congress in Paris in 1994. Triathlon made its Olympic debut at the 2000 Games in Sydney.

Since its inception World Triathlon has maintained its headquarters in Vancouver, Canada until January 1, 2014 when it moved to Lausanne, Switzerland, home of the IOC and many international sporting bodies.

Spain's Marisol Casado was elected as World Triathlon's second president in November 2008. She became an IOC member in February 2010 at the 122nd IOC Session in World Triathlon's hometown of Vancouver. She was re-elected for a new four-year term in October 2012. The Canadian Loreen Barnett maintains its general secretary 3, with Sarah Springman named 1st  vice-president and honorary member of the World Federation, hence in 2012 it was the only worldwide federation of an Olympic sport with an all-female management. In December 2016, Casado was re-elected for a third term as president of the International Federation at the 29th Congress held in Madrid 6.

In 2009 the International Triathlon Federation reorganised its top level competitions changing the World championship to the World Triathlon Series, an eight-stage competition circuit in eight countries, and relegated the world cup down to a second tier series below the world series with less prize money and world ranking points. It also organizes a series of world competitions at different distances from chained sports derived from the triathlon it manages, such as duathlon, aquathlon, cross-triathlon, winter triathlon and paratriathlon.

In June 2017, following the renewal of the federal application, the International Olympic Committee included a third triathlon event on the 2020 Tokyo Olympic Games, the mixed team relay. With the men's and women's short-distance triathlon events, three triathlon events offer Olympic titles to triathletes. By joining other sports who practice these forms of mixed events, this approach within the scope of the promotion of equality policies between men and women triathletes supported by the international federation.

In September 2017, World Triathlon announced the death of its founding and honorary President, Les McDonald, at the age of 84. He was awarded the Order of Canada in 2013 for service to the nation and inducted into its  "Hall of Fame" in 2014 for his work for triathlon.

In October 2020, the ITU officially adopted the name World Triathlon.

International structure

World Triathlon is structured into 5 continental regions, through which 172 national federations (the governing body of triathlon in each country) are affiliated to World Triathlon. Each region offers a Continental Championship and Continental Cup Series.

 Asia Triathlon representing 35 national federations
 Africa Triathlon representing 37 national federations
 Europe Triathlon representing 46 national federations
 Americas Triathlon representing 40 national federations
 Oceania Triathlon representing 14 national federations

In response to the 2022 Russian invasion of Ukraine, Europe Triathlon said that it strongly supported  the decision of the International Olympic Committee and World Triathlon to exclude Russian and Belarusian athletes and officials from organised European events, and to not organise international events in Russia or Belarus.

Development
World Triathlon has an ongoing effort to develop the sport especially outside of Europe and English speaking countries. One method is through development grants such as the recent one to the African Triathlon Union, with most of the money to national federations allowing for support of organize events, as well as funding for athlete, coach and Technical Officials courses. Another is athlete scholarships to be given to young athletes that have shown talent but who need more support than their developing National Federation can give, allowing them to perform at an international level, the end goal of these scholarships is the athletes performing for their county at the Olympic games. One global development is the introduction of certifications for coaching and technical officials meaning that important events will be contested at the high level.

Ranking system
World Triathlon publishes and maintains the World Rankings for the men's and women's competitions in both short and long course for triathlon and duathlon as well as aquathlon and winter triathlon races it also has a ranking for the national teams mixed relay. Each ranking has a slightly different point system but all are calculated via a rolling calendar, by taking a set number of the highest scoring results from the previous 52 weeks and adding them to a set number of the highest scoring results from the 53 to 104 weeks previous. Each races maximum score is decided by the ITU's ranking criteria and then the athlete who comes first will earn that many points with each following athlete earning 7.5% less point than the athlete before them.

Championships
In its founding year World Triathlon only ran the World triathlon championship, the following year it also began hosting the duathlon world championship. In 1991 the ITU started hosting a series of triathlon races as the triathlon World Cup. The distances chosen for the World championship and World Cup races were 1,500m swimming, 40 km of bike and 10 km of running, these parameters were chosen from existing distances in swimming, cycling and running disciplines in the Olympic Games. This triathlon distance has become known as the standard distance in the world of triathlon. In 1994 to have a long-distance championship similar to Ironman Triathlon events but hosted by the sports governing body the Long Distance Triathlon World Championships was founded and in 1997 parity was brought to duathlon with the Long Distance Duathlon World Championships. Also in 1997 the first Winter Triathlon World Championships was held giving the sport of winter triathlons its own world championship. Then in 1998 the Aquathlon World Championships were inaugurated, giving aquathlon its own world championship. In 2009 the Triathlon Mixed Relay World Championships was held to organise an elite-level international  relay. The most recently created tournament is the Cross Triathlon World Championships; similar to how long-distance world championships were introduced to mirror the well known Ironman events, it was created to allow the sports governing body to have a world championship instead of XTERRA Triathlon. Both Ironman and XTERRA also operate 'world championship' events.

The world championship events organised by World Triathlon include:

In triathlon:
World Triathlon Championship Series
World Triathlon Long Distance Championships
World Triathlon Sprint Distance Championships
World Triathlon Mixed Relay Championships
World Triathlon Cup
In duathlon
World Triathlon Duathlon Championships
World Triathlon Long Distance Duathlon Championships
In aquathlon:
World Triathlon Aquathlon Championships
In winter triathlon:
World Triathlon Winter Championships
In triathlon cross
World Triathlon Cross Championships

References

External links

 
Sports organizations established in 1989
Triathlon organizations
IOC-recognised international federations
International sports bodies based in Switzerland